Raymond Elena (born 4 August 1931) is a French former professional racing cyclist. He rode in four editions of the Tour de France.

References

External links
 

1931 births
Living people
French male cyclists
Sportspeople from Oran